The Great Western Railway Leo Class  was a class of broad gauge steam locomotives for goods train work. This class was introduced into service between January 1841 and July 1842, and withdrawn between September 1864 and June 1874.

These locomotives were the first for the railway with coupled wheels as they were designed as goods locomotives, but they later found use on passenger trains too. All the class were altered to s.

The locomotives were built by three different workshops, each with its own naming convention. The first three came from R and W Hawthorn and Company, who named them after strong animals. The next three were named after volcanoes by Fenton, Murray and Jackson, while the final twelve came from Rothwell and Company carrying the names of the twelve houses of the zodiac.

Locomotives

Notes

References

Leo
2-4-0 locomotives
Broad gauge (7 feet) railway locomotives
Hawthorn locomotives
Railway locomotives introduced in 1841
Scrapped locomotives